The 2022 Súper Liga Americana de Rugby season was the third season of the Súper Liga Americana de Rugby, an annual rugby union competition sanctioned by Sudamérica Rugby.

Format
The six clubs in the competition competed in the regular season, which took place over 10 rounds and consisted of a double round-robin, with each participating club playing two matches against each of the other five clubs. The top 4 clubs at the end of the regular season moved on to the knockout stage where the clubs then played in a knockout tournament, consisting of semi-finals and eventually, the final.

Teams

Venues
Due to the COVID-19 pandemic the 2022 season was held in Chile, Paraguay and Uruguay only. The first phase of the season was held in Asunción, Ciudad del Este, Santiago and Valparaíso respectively. The second phase of the season (including the championship playoffs) was held at Estadio Charrúa in Montevideo.

Regular season
The regular season began on 13 March and ended on 15 May.

Standings

Matches
The following are the match results for the 2022 Super Liga Americana de Rugby regular season:

Round 1

Round 2

Round 3

Note:
 This was the first loss suffered by an Argentinian club in the history of the competition.

Note:
 This was Cafeteros Pro's first victory in the history of this competition.

Round 4

Round 5

Round 6

Round 7

Round 8

Round 9

Round 10

Knockout stage

Semi-finals

Final

References

External links
 Official website

Super Rugby Americas
2022 in Argentine rugby union
2022 rugby union tournaments for clubs